Grayston LeRoy Lynch (June 14, 1923 – August 10, 2008) was an American soldier and CIA officer. He was one of the two CIA officers who commanded the faction of the army that went to war in the Bay of Pigs Invasion. The other agent was William "Rip" Robertson.

Lynch was raised in Victoria, Texas and was the son of an oil driller. He was wounded at Normandy, the Battle of the Bulge, and Heartbreak Ridge in Korea; served with the Special Forces in Laos; and received three Purple Hearts, two Silver Stars and one Bronze Star with a "V" for valor, among other awards. He was selected from the elite to become a Paramilitary Operations Officer in the CIA's famed Special Activities Division in 1960. For his extraordinary heroism at the Bay of Pigs, Lynch was awarded the Intelligence Star, the CIA's most coveted award. In the six years after the Bay of Pigs invasion, he ran commando raids into Cuba. Lynch retired from the CIA in 1971.

Military service
Born in Gilmer, Texas, Lynch lied about his age by claiming to be born in 1920 and enlisted in the U.S. Army in 1938 and was assigned to 5th Cavalry at Fort Clark, Texas. During World War II he was assigned to the Second Division as platoon sergeant. During D-day he landed at Omaha Beach and then fought in the Battle of the Bulge where he was seriously wounded. He served in the Korean War with the Second Division as Second Lt., promoted to First Lt., wounded at Battle of Bloody Ridge. Later served in Laos with 77th Special Forces Group as Captain, retiring from them in 1960.

Education
Lynch received a BA degree in political science from the University of Maryland, College Park in 1953.

CIA career
(1960–1971)
In 1960 he joined the CIA working under Theodore Shackley.  Grayston spent the majority of his time between Key West and Miami.  After the Bay of Pigs Grayston began conducting paramilitary training of Cuban exiles at JM/WAVE and conducted commando raids inside Cuba for six years.  He personally led over 100 raids into Cuba.

DEA

BNDD Career (DEA)
(1971 to 1973)
Grayston Joined Bureau of Narcotics and Dangerous Drugs (BNDD) which would later be renamed Drug Enforcement Agency (DEA).

BUNCIN Career (DEACON)
(1973 to 1978)
Grayston was recruited by Lucien Conien into Bureau of Narcotics Counter-Intelligence Network (BUNCIN), later renamed DEA Clandestine Operations Network (DEACON) after the Bureau of Narcotics and Dangerous Drugs (BNDD) was renamed Drug Enforcement Administration (DEA).  Bob Medell requisitioned Grayston Lynch to work directly with him in BUNCIN.  Lynch's primary task was to identify offshore suppliers of illegal drugs. Grayston had been running secret CIA operations in Cuba, Central and South America for many years and developed numerous clandestine resources.

Published works
Lynch wrote a book, Decision for Disaster: Betrayal at the Bay of Pigs, based on his experience leading the rebel Brigade 2506.

References

External links
 Miami Herald article (1998)
 War of Wits Publishing Ltd Biographical Data on Lynch's own website
 The History of BUNCIN (2010)
 Spartacus Educational

1923 births
2008 deaths
People from Gilmer, Texas
People from Victoria, Texas
United States Army soldiers
United States Army personnel of World War II
United States Army officers
United States Army personnel of the Korean War
Recipients of the Silver Star
University of Maryland, College Park alumni
People of the Central Intelligence Agency
Cold War spies
Recipients of the Intelligence Star
Drug Enforcement Administration personnel